Below may refer to:

Earth
Ground (disambiguation)
Soil
Floor
Bottom (disambiguation)
Less than
Temperatures below freezing
Hell or underworld

People with the surname
Ernst von Below (1863–1955), German World War I general
Fred Below (1926–1988), American blues drummer
Fritz von Below (1853–1918), German World War I general
Gerd-Paul von Below (1892-1953), German World War II general
Otto von Below (1857–1944), German World War I general
Nicolaus von Below (1907–1983), German adjutant of Adolf Hitler

Other uses
Below (album), a 2021 album by Beartooth
Below (film), a 2002 film by David Twohy
Below (video game), a video game by Capybara Games
Below Records, a record label
Below Par Records, a record label
The Great Below, a song by Nine Inch Nails

See also
Belov